Han Hong-gyu (born 26 July 1990) is a South Korean footballer who plays as a striker for Bay Olympic in New Zealand's Northern League.

Career
He signed with Chungju Hummel FC before 2013 season. He scored his debut goal against Suwon FC on 21 April.

Honours 
Asan Mugunghwa FC
 K League 2 winners: 2016

References

External links 

1990 births
Living people
Association football forwards
South Korean footballers
Chungju Hummel FC players
Ansan Mugunghwa FC players
K League 2 players
Sungkyunkwan University alumni
South Korean expatriates in New Zealand